The West Bakersfield Interchange is a freeway interchange in Bakersfield, California, west of downtown. It connects State Route 99 (Golden State Freeway) with SR 58 (Mojave Freeway). These routes represent the heart of the Bakersfield freeway network. They connect the city with commercial centers in the San Joaquin Valley, ports in Los Angeles, and major Interstate freeways serving southern and eastern America.

The original interchange plan was more elaborate. Five freeway segments (three signed routes) would connect through a series of three interchanges, forming a triangle. Those routes were SR 99 (Golden State Freeway), SR 58 (Mojave Freeway/Westside Parkway), and SR 178 (Crosstown Freeway). However, only three segments and part of one interchange were constructed. However, the Westside Parkway will soon connect with the interchange once construction is completed in fall 2022.

Since the interchange is being designed relatively late, compared to other major California freeway interchanges, several design elements are incorporated to help alleviate traffic. Unlike the East Los Angeles and Orange Crush interchanges, the three Kern County interchanges will be widely spaced (between ) from one another. Also, local interchanges within  of it will transition onto their own parallel roads, and merge with the mainline after the main interchange.

History
The western extension as well as the northern leg of the interchange were not constructed. It was delayed first by a four-year freeway construction moratorium imposed by Governor Jerry Brown (1977–81) and was followed by 25 years of opposition from the City of Bakersfield (1980–2005).

In 2005, federal money was secured for the construction of several projects in the Bakersfield area, including construction of the southern leg of the interchange, connecting the Mojave Freeway to the Westside Parkway. This will also complete construction of the existing interchange, and provide improvements which will be incorporated into the future construction of the other two interchanges. The city would also drop its opposition to the project, with the city council voting to give Caltrans full control over it. The city would retain control over the construction of the Westside Parkway.

Future
Efforts are currently underway for the construction of the southern leg, as well as finishing the existing interchange. In 2005, $330 million was secured through the Safe, Accountable, Flexible, Efficient Transportation Equity Act: A Legacy for Users (SAFETEA-LU) for the construction of the Centennial Corridor. The southern leg of the interchange is a part phase 3 of that project. However, the project was controversial since it displaced dozens of homes and businesses.

The project is expected to be completed in fall 2022, but will not include ramps for southbound SR 99 traffic to directly transition to westbound SR 58, or eastbound SR 58 traffic to transition to northbound SR 99. These ramps would be a part of the SR 99/178 interchange, if constructed.

See also
 
 
 Transportation in Kern County, California

References

External links
 Caltrans - Centennial Corridor Project

Road interchanges in California
Transportation in Bakersfield, California